Sarasota Polo Club is a polo club located in Sarasota, Florida in Sarasota County. The club was founded in 1991 by Robert Uihlein Jr. of Schroeder-Manatee Ranch (SMR). The property is described as the first development within the master planned community of Lakewood Ranch.

Features
The property contains nine world-class polo fields, thirty-five private ranches,  track, boarding facilities for 72 horses, and a clubhouse.

References

Polo clubs in the United States